Vladislav Arkadyevich Mikushin (born 18 April 2001) is a Russian football player. He plays for FC Leningradets Leningrad Oblast.

Club career
He made his debut for FC Rubin Kazan on 6 March 2019 in a Russian Cup game against FC Lokomotiv Moscow.

On 19 July 2019, he joined FC Fakel Voronezh on loan. He made his Russian Football National League debut for Fakel on 28 July 2019 in a game against FC SKA-Khabarovsk.

On 28 September 2020, he moved on loan to FC Leningradets Leningrad Oblast.

References

External links
 
 
 

2001 births
Sportspeople from Tomsk
Living people
Russian footballers
Russia youth international footballers
Association football defenders
FC Rubin Kazan players
FC Fakel Voronezh players
FC Neftekhimik Nizhnekamsk players
FC Leningradets Leningrad Oblast players
FC Yenisey Krasnoyarsk players
Russian First League players
Russian Second League players